Events in the year 1715 in Norway.

Incumbents
Monarch: Frederick IV

Events
 19 April - Start of the Sami mission by the College of Missions.

Arts and literature

Births
Peder Hjort, businessperson (died 1789)

Deaths
Hans Paus, priest and poet (born 1656).

See also

References